Neha Mahajan (born 18 August 1990) is an Indian actress and model known for her works predominantly in Marathi and Hindi films, in addition to Marathi theatre. Mahajan made her debut in an English film in 2012, the Canadian-British production Midnight's Children directed by Deepa Mehta.

In 2013, Mahajan played Ophelia in Madhav Vaze's stage production of Hamlet in Marathi. She then appeared in Ajoba (2013), and Feast of Varanasi (2014). In 2015, she made her Mollywood debut as Vishaya in the indie drama The Painted House. Most recently Neha appeared in the 2019 Netflix series Leila, a dystopian drama. She was also seen in Rohit Shetty's action film Simmba. In 2020, she made her Hollywood debut in the action-thriller Extraction.

Early life
Mahajan is the daughter of Sitar artist Pandit Vidur Mahajan, and has been accompanying him on his sitar performances while also performing solo. She was born in Talegaon Dabhade, Pune in the state of Maharashtra. Mahajan attended Trimble Tech High School in Texas, and later finished her master's degree in Philosophy from the University of Pune. She has been involved in theater and cinema and has worked in Marathi, English, Hindi and Malayalam language cinemas.

Filmography

References

External links 

Living people
Indian film actresses
Female models from Maharashtra
Actresses in Malayalam cinema
Actresses in Marathi cinema
People from Talegaon
1990 births
Actresses from Pune
Actresses in Hindi cinema
21st-century Indian actresses